Thorpe Camp, officially known as the Thorpe Camp Visitor Centre, is the former Royal Air Force barracks for RAF Woodhall Spa. Built in 1940 during the Second World War, the site included Officer, Sergeant and Airman messes, a NAAFI building, ration store, latrines and ablution blocks. The site closed in the 1960s.

The remaining buildings - the Airman's mess, NAAFI, ablution block, and ration store - are now preserved within the boundaries of the visitor centre, by the Thorpe Camp Preservation Group Limited. The visitor centre commemorates both the Royal Air Force, and RAF Woodhall Spa history, as well as civilian life in Lincolnshire in the 1940s.

Dedications to RAF Woodhall Spa 
The visitor centre has various dedications to RAF Woodhall Spa, including a display for each of the squadrons that were either stationed there, or had operations relating to the station. The centre also has a dedication to the Air Training Corps, an organisation that provided training and experience to young people in both World War II, and beyond.

97 Squadron 
97 Squadron was a training squadron based at nearby RAF Waddington during the First World War. The squadron was disbanded on 1 April 1920 after being renumbered, becoming No. 60 Squadron. The squadron was reformed on 16 September 1935 at RAF Catfoss, and later became one of the Pathfinder squadrons in April 1943.

617 Squadron 
Commonly known as the Dambusters, No. 617 Squadron was the squadron that took part in Operation Chastise in May 1943, destroying Nazi factories, mines, and hydro-electric power stations. 617 Squadron was based at RAF Scampton, but often made use of RAF Woodhall Spa during exercises and missions.

619 Squadron 
No. 619 Squadron was a Heavy bomber squadron, initially formed at RAF Woodhall Spa on 18 April 1943. The squadron flew the Avro Lancaster, and took place in many bombing raids on Nazi Germany.

627 Squadron 
No. 627 Squadron alike No. 97 Squadron was a member of the Pathfinder squadrons. It operated from both RAF Oakington and RAF Woodhall Spa throughout the war, as a bomber squadron, reconnaissance and also a specialised target marking squadron.

References

External links
 Thorpe Camp Visitor Centre

Military history of Lincolnshire
Museums in Lincolnshire
World War II museums in the United Kingdom